Sascha Lobo (born 11 May 1975 in Berlin) is a German blogger, writer, journalist and copywriter. Lobo's work is primarily concerned with the Internet and with the social effects of new technology.

Career 

In 2000, Lobo founded a short-lived advertising agency, and in the following years worked in advertising while also writing for the magazine Blond. In 2005 he co-founded the blog Riesenmaschine. The following year his book Wir nennen es Arbeit (engl. "We call it work", co-written with Holm Friebe) was published.

In 2007 Lobo co-founded  (later renamed ), a blog-focussed marketing agency.

His first novel Strohfeuer was published in September 2010.

Books 
 Holm Friebe, Sascha Lobo: Wir nennen es Arbeit – die digitale Bohème oder: intelligentes Leben jenseits der Festanstellung. Heyne, München 2006. 
 Kathrin Passig, Holm Friebe, Aleks Scholz, Sascha Lobo (Hrsg.): Riesenmaschine – das Beste aus dem brandneuen Universum. Heyne, München 2007. 
 Kathrin Passig, Sascha Lobo: Dinge geregelt kriegen – ohne einen Funken Selbstdisziplin. Rowohlt, Berlin 2008. 
 Sascha Lobo: Strohfeuer Rowohlt, Berlin 2010. 
 Sascha Lobo: Realitätsschock Kiepenheuer & Witsch, Köln 2019. 
 Sascha Lobo: Realitätsschock: Zehn Lehren aus der Gegenwart + neu: Der Corona-Schock. KiWi-Taschenbuch, Köln 2020.

Audiobooks 
 2019: Realitätsschock: Zehn Lehren aus der Gegenwart (abridged, read by Sascha Lobo), Random House Audio, 
 2019: Realitätsschock: Zehn Lehren aus der Gegenwart (Audiobook-download, unabridged, read by Sascha Lobo), Random House Audio,

References

External links

 Official Website

1975 births
Living people
German journalists
German male journalists
German bloggers
German non-fiction writers
German columnists
German Internet celebrities
German male writers
Male bloggers